Zamora Municipality is a municipality in Michoacán, Mexico.

The seat is at Zamora, Michoacán.

Municipalities of Zamora:
-Ejidio Independencia La Labor
-Guamuchil
-La Estancia
-Sauz de Magaña
-Atacheo, un pueblo donde toda la municipalidad se congrega para festejar varias fiestas, como las de indepencencia, y fiestas religiosas. Especialmente el 12 de Diciembre, celebrando la Virgen De Guadalupe.

Three police officers were killed and 10 people injured in a shoot-out in Zamora Municipality on May 26, 2019.

References

Municipalities of Michoacán